The United Railroad Historical Society of New Jersey, Inc. (or URHS of NJ) is a non profit educational organization directed at supporting the preservation of New Jersey's historical railroad equipment and artifacts for the proposed New Jersey Transportation Heritage Center or in its absence, another railroad museum in New Jersey.

In order to coordinate resources, representatives from most of New Jersey's major railroad-interest organizations formed the URHS of NJ in 1987.  URHS of NJ has been working toward rescuing potential items from scrapping and has been assisting in searching for the location of The New Jersey Transportation Heritage Center.  The URHS of NJ expects to play a major role in its design, content and operation.

The United Railroad Historical Society of NJ Inc. is located at 104 Morris Avenue in Boonton, NJ. The zip code is 07005–1314.

Organizations involved
The URHS board of directors is, as of 2021 composed of representatives of 10 of the original 17 member groups.  The purpose of this is to assure all participate equally in the decision making and activities and will be representative of all of the local railroad history community.  Individuals may join any member organization or The Friends of the New Jersey Transportation Heritage Center to participate in URHS efforts.

 Black River and Western Historical Trust

 Erie Lackawanna Historical Society

 Jersey Central Railway Historical Society, Inc. - Chapter, NRHS 

 Lackawanna Chapter, The Railway & Locomotive Historical Society

 Liberty Historic Railway, Inc.

 New York, Susquehanna and Western Technical and Historical Society

 North Jersey Electric Railway Historical Society
 
 Tri-State Railway Historical Society Chapter, NRHS

 West Jersey Chapter, NRHS
 
 Whippany Railway Museum, Inc.

Preservation activities
A large part of the URHS collection was moved from the Lebanon and Ridgefield Park NJ storage locations to Boonton railyard in 2010. With that accomplished the ability to do cosmetic restoration was greatly enhanced.

The organization leased a large vacant building in 2021 to allow for further preservation work to be conducted indoors.

References

External links
 United Railroad Historical Society of NJ official website

Historical societies in New Jersey
Rail transportation in New Jersey
Rail transportation preservation in the United States
Non-profit organizations based in New Jersey
Organizations established in 1987